What Digital Camera was a monthly magazine and website about digital cameras published by TI Media. Its editor was Nigel Atherton.

History 
The magazine was launched fully after a few one-off editions on 14 August 2003 and describes itself as "world's oldest digital photography magazine". Its last issue was published in December 2016.

References

External links
 
 

Monthly magazines published in the United Kingdom
Magazines established in 2003
Magazines disestablished in 2016
English-language magazines
Digital photography
Digital cameras
Photography magazines
Photography in the United Kingdom
Visual arts magazines published in the United Kingdom